The progressive squeeze (also termed a "repeating squeeze") is a contract bridge squeeze that gains two tricks by squeezing one and the same player twice, hence the name. A progressive squeezes is a subset of triple squeezes that, depending both on entries and on positional factors, may result in a subsequent, simple, two-suit squeeze that takes place against the opponent who has just been triple squeezed. Confusing the issue is that some triple squeezes can become progressive squeezes through misdefense.

Examples
The first diagram shows a basic example:
 When the ace of clubs is cashed East is squeezed and has to discard one of his red aces, the established king is cashed (this is the progressive squeeze card) and East is squeezed for another trick.

In the above example an extended menace, threatening the immediate loss of two tricks was present. That is not always necessary, a progressive squeeze still works if we have an additional entry as compensation.
 When the ace of clubs is cashed East can either discard the diamond ace, after which the diamond king will seal his fate, or bare one of his major suit holdings in which case the jack in that suit will be the progressive squeeze card. Had West East's cards the best defense to discard a spade will break the second squeeze.

See also
 Further reading on squeeze play.

Contract bridge squeezes